Semion Moshiashvili is an Israeli politician currently serving as a member of the Knesset for Shas. He previously served as a member of the Kiryat Ata City Council.

Biography 
Moshiashvili served in the Israeli Navy, before acquiring a bachelor's degree in law and becoming a practicing lawyer. In 2018, Moshiashvili was elected to Kiryat Ata's city council, leading his own list. In 2021, he was sued by members of the municipal opposition alongside the city's mayor. He subsequently resigned from the council in February 2021 after receiving the fourteenth spot on Shas' list ahead of that year's legislative election.

Ahead of the 2022 Israeli legislative election, Moshiashvili was given the he was given the list's fifteenth spot, and was not elected as the party won eleven seats. However, he entered the Knesset on 2 February 2023 under the Norwegian Law.

Personal life 
Moshiashvili is married and has five children.

References

External links 

Members of the 25th Knesset (2022–)
Shas politicians
Living people
Year of birth missing (living people)